The 19101/19102 Virar - Bharuch MEMU Express is a MEMU express train of the Indian Railways connecting  in Maharashtra and  of Gujarat. It is currently being operated with 19101/19102 train numbers on a daily basis.

Service

The 19101/Virar - Bharuch MEMU Express has average speed of 40 km/hr and covers 267 km in 6 hrs 45 mins.

The 19102/Bharuch - Virar MEMU Express has average speed of 40 km/hr and covers 267 km in 7 hrs 15 mins.

Route 

Coach composite

The train consists of 20 MEMU Rake Coaches.

External links 

 19101/Virar - Bharuch MEMU Express
 19102/Bharuch - Virar MEMU Express

References 

Electric multiple units in Gujarat
Rail transport in Maharashtra
Electric multiple units of India
Transport in Bharuch
Transport in Vasai-Virar